Jellaby is a webcomic by Kean Soo, featuring a character of the same name. Jellaby has appeared in several volumes of the comics anthology Flight, as well as in its own self-titled webcomic. A full-length graphic novel, Jellaby, was published in 2008. The success of the first book led to a sequel, Jellaby: Monster in the City, which was published in 2009.

Awards
Nomination for an Eisner Award for Best Digital Comic 2006
Winner of a Shuster Award for Best Comic for Kids 2009

References

Volumes
Flight Volume Three: 
Flight Volume Five: 
Flight Volume Six: 
Flight Explorer Volume One:

External links
Jellaby webcomic homepage

Canadian graphic novels
Webcomic characters
Joe Shuster Award winners for Comics for Kids